Telstar 1 is a defunct communications satellite launched by NASA on July 10, 1962. It was the satellite that allowed the first live broadcast of television images between the United States and Europe. Telstar 1 remained active for only 7 months before it prematurely failed due to Starfish Prime, a high-altitude nuclear test conducted by the United States. Although the satellite is no longer operational, it remains in Earth orbit.

History

The idea of transmitting information by means of satellites was hardly new. As early as October 1945, the mathematician and visionary Arthur C. Clarke published an article talking about it in the specialized magazine Wireless World. His idea was to take advantage of the immensity of space to transmit information, using a satellite system for this purpose. During the Cold War, the shock caused by the successful launch of the first artificial satellite, Sputnik 1, by the Soviets increased the United States' interest in aerospace research. Soon thereafter, the Americans began their attempts to launch orbital communications satellites for transmitting telephone, radio, and television signals.

In December 1958, the United States successfully launched its first communications satellite, SCORE. Through it, then-President Dwight D. Eisenhower sent a Christmas message to the entire world. However, SCORE stayed in orbit for only a few months, its enormous surface area and very low Earth orbit forcing reentry after only 500 laps around the planet due to aerodynamic resistance. Also, SCORE relied on a passive reflector, which greatly reduced signal strength, since it did not amplify the signal before sending it back to earth.

Launch
Telstar 1 was launched on July 10, 1962, from the Cape Canaveral Air Force Station, Florida, atop a Delta rocket.

Operations
A 53-meter terrestrial antenna manufactured by AT&T Corporation, located in Andover, Maine, was used for the transmissions between the United States and Europe. Built in 1961, and used by Telstar 1, it was later used by Relay 1. Telstar 1 operated normally from launch until November 1962 when the radiation from the Starfish Prime detonation affected the command channel, which began to behave erratically. The satellite was continuously switched on to work around this problem. On November 23, 1962, the command channel stopped responding. On December 20, the satellite was successfully reactivated, and intermittent data were obtained until February 21, 1963, when the transmitter failed. The energy used by it was produced by 3,600 solar cells. The satellite relied on an active repeater and magnified signal strength by a factor of a hundred using a travelling wave tube amplifier (TWTA). Thirteen days after the launch, the first live broadcast of a television show between the United States and Europe took place.

Broadcasting

References

External links
 Telstar. N2yo.com
 Stamps and envelopes related to Telstar I . National Postal Museum

Telstar satellites
Spacecraft launched in 1962
1962 in the United States
Derelict satellites orbiting Earth